Harold Vincent Herd (12 December 1909 – 11 April 1962) was a rugby union player who represented Australia.

Herd, a centre, was born in Coffs Harbour, New South Wales and claimed 1 international rugby cap for Australia.

References

Australian rugby union players
Australia international rugby union players
1909 births
1962 deaths
Rugby union centres
Rugby union players from New South Wales